Robert O'Driscoll (1938 – 29 February 1996) was an Irish writer, English professor at St. Michael's College, University of Toronto and visiting lecturer at University College Dublin.

Biography 
O'Driscoll founded Canadian Association for Irish Studies (CAIS) in 1973. He studied at University of London.

Literary works

 Atlantis Again - The Story of a Family, with Elizabeth Elliott, 1993, ISBN 978-0969630616.
 New World Order, Corruption in Canada, with Elizabeth Elliott, Saigon Press, Toronto, ON, 1994

References

1938 births
1996 deaths
Irish writers
Academic staff of the University of Toronto
Academics of University College Dublin
Alumni of the University of London
Writers from Newfoundland and Labrador
Canadian people of Irish descent
20th-century Irish writers
20th-century Canadian writers
Founders of academic institutions